Kuverami (4th century) was the queen regnant of the Chandra dynasty in 334-341. 

She may have been the widow of king Rimbhiappa, and succeeded him on his death. According to traditional account of her reign, she was a powerful ruler who managed to clear the kingdom of its enemies.

References

 Noel F. Singer, Vaishali and the Indianization of Arakan

4th-century women rulers
4th-century Indian people
Ancient Indian women